The Children's Storefront was a tuition-free private school in Harlem, founded in 1966 by the poet Ned O'Gorman. It was the subject of a 1988 documentary film, The Children's Storefront, nominated for an Academy Award for Best Documentary Short.

References

External links
Listing at New York State Association of Independent Schools (NYSAIS)
The Children's Storefront School Website:
Ned O'Gorman at poets.org
Ned O'Gorman Papers at Georgetown University

Private schools in Manhattan
Educational institutions established in 1966
Schools in Harlem
1966 establishments in New York City